Yuryuzan is a town in Katav-Ivanovsky District of Chelyabinsk Oblast, Russia, located on the Yuryuzan River (left tributary of the Ufa River),  from Chelyabinsk, the administrative center of the oblast. Population:

History
It was established in 1758 as the settlement of Yuryuzan-Ivanovsky Zavod to support the construction of an ironworks. Since the end of the 19th century, the settlement is known as Yuryuzansky Zavod. It was granted town status and renamed Yuryuzan on June 18, 1943.

Administrative and municipal status
Within the framework of administrative divisions, it is, together with one rural locality (the village of Pervukha), incorporated within Katav-Ivanovsky District as the Town of Yuryuzan. As a municipal division, the Town of Yuryuzan is incorporated within Katav-Ivanovsky Municipal District as Yuryuzanskoye Urban Settlement.

Economy
Town economy centers around a large plant which produces refrigerators.

References

Notes

Sources

Cities and towns in Chelyabinsk Oblast
Ufa Governorate